Dutch Malabar (Dutch; Nederlandse Malabar. Malayalam; ഡച്ച് മലബാർ.) also known by the name of its main settlement Cochin, was the title of a commandment of the Dutch East India Company on the Malabar Coast between 1661 and 1795, and was a subdivision of what was collectively referred to as Dutch India. Dutch presence in the Malabar region started with the capture of Portuguese Quilon, and ended with the conquest of Malabar by the British in 1795. They possessed military outposts in 11 locations: Alleppey, Ayacotta, Chendamangalam, Pappinivattom, Ponnani, Pallipuram, Cranganore (from 15January 1662), Chetwai, Cannanore (from 15February 1663), Cochin (7January 16631795), and Quilon (29December 165814 April 1659 and from 24December 1661 – 1795).

The Kingdom of Cochin was an ally of the Dutch East India Company. The Dutch enlarged the Royal Palace built by the Portuguese at Mattancheri for the King of Cochin, which from then on became known as the "Dutch Palace". In 1744, an impressive palace later called Bolgatty Palace, was erected on Bolghatty Island for the Dutch Governors.

The Dutch contributed a monumental work called Hortus Indicus Malabaricus on the medicinal properties of Malabar plants. In Cochin, the Dutch established an orphanage for poor European children and a leper asylum on Vypin.

History

Alliance with Cochin

The allies moved towards Cochin and marched upon the palace of the official Raja on 5February 1662. His family members had allied with Dutch. The dutch helped Cochin  to get rid of the Portuguese-friendly king. The Portuguese-friendly king was killed in the subsequent battle along with two of his juniors. Cochin royal family appointed a new king, and ordered the Dutch to besiege the Portuguese fort. Cochin and the chief of Paliyam provided supplies to the Dutch, who faced heroic Portuguese resistance during the prolonged siege. The Native rulers of Porca and Cembakasseri kept the besieged supplied with provisions. Though disrupted by monsoon rains and the deaths of the ruler of Calicut and important Dutch officers, the garrison finally capitulated on January8, 1663. The terms of the capitulation were that all the unmarried Portuguese residents were returned to Europe, and all married Portuguese and Mestiços were transferred to Goa. The last governor of Portuguese Cochin was Inácio Sarmento. It was said that about four thousand people were banished and decades of Portuguese supremacy in Malabar came to an end. Fort Cochin now became the primary ally of the Dutch in South Asia.

Battles for supremacy on Malabar

The Zamorin of Calicut had sought Dutch cooperation so that he can annex Cochin. Hence his stipulation for the cession of Vypin and reduction of the Cochin Raja to the position of a Calicut tributary in the treaty of 1662. But the Dutch, having established themselves in Cochin and Calicut, asked them to fulfill their treaty obligations.

It was in these circumstances, Calicut welcomed the British and allowed them to establish a factory at Calicut in 1664. The Dutch authorities in Amsterdam were alarmed and wrote to their officers in India to "spare no pains" to secure the expulsion of the British from Calicut. The Dutch carried off four or five guns from Calicut and attacked Cranganore. The Dutch and their ally Cochin at once summoned the vassals of Cochin, like Thekkumkur, Vatakkumkur, Paravur, Chempakasseri and Mangatt. Calicut forces, including Moplahs and supported by a Portuguese named Pacheco, were at first successful. After a year of desultory fighting, the Calicut forces withdrew, and the Dutch destroyed the Fort Round and built a bastion near Cranganore.

In 1669, Dutch Malabar became a separate commandment of the Dutch East India Company (VOC); beforehand it had been governed from Batavia. In 1670, the Zamorin of Calicut ruler was persuaded by his prince to go to Cranganore to encourage the Nairs. But, the Dutch made a surprise attack on the Zamorin's camp. Thirty Dutch lost their lives this raid, and in the confusion of the battle, the Royal Sword of Calicut was destroyed. The Calicut ruler fell back to Papinivattom, and the prince attacked the bastion and captured it. In 1673, VOC representative Hendrik van Rheede came to Cochin as its Commander. He re-occupied the bastion and demanded the cession of Chetwai - the route to Cochin from Calicut. He came to Port Ponani in 1678 and met with the Calicut ruler. Tired of the hostility shown by most of the natives, the Dutch opened negotiations with Calicut. The Commissary General of Batavia, the head of the Dutch Government in the East Indies, came to Ponani in 1696 without even stopping at Cochin. In the meantime, Calicut formed a large anti-Dutch alliance and signed a new treaty with the English. In the following years, they made raids deep into Cochin areas (1701–1710). The Dutch supported their ally Cochin and began to construct a fort for the security of Chetwai. Soon, Calicut sent a force to pull down the fortifications and expelled the Dutch from Chetwai (1714). The Chief of the English factory had a great hand in promoting this. Calicut resolved to follow up on this success by attacking Cranganore and Pappinivattom. But, the Dutch under Councillor William Bucker Jacobs retaliated by defeating the Calicut and English armies and on April10, 1719 the Dutch formally took command of Fort William, as the fort at Chetwai was called then. This Cochin-Dutch victory was a heavy blow to the English and Robert Adams.

The Dutch gradually began to consider their forts and garrisons in Malabar an economic burden, while the British East India Company dominance of commerce in Malabar increased. On September10, 1691 the Dutch transferred Chetwai back to Calicut and reduced the size and strength of their forces across Malabar. The fear of Cochin-Dutch alliance began to fade in the minds of Calicut rulers. In 1721, the supreme council of the Dutch East Indies in Batavia agreed that it would no longer support its ally Cochin against Calicut, betraying century old friendship.

Defeat against Travancore and Kew Letters

The Dutch never succeeded in establishing a pepper trade monopoly in Malabar and were all the more frustrated in their attempts when the young ruler of Travancore, Marthanda Varma, started to expand his kingdom. The Travancore–Dutch War that followed culminated in the Battle of Colachel, which proved disastrous for the Dutch. Eustachius De Lannoy, a naval commander in the Dutch army, was taken prisoner and subsequently became a commander in the Travancore army. De Lannoy later helped Travancore to establish an organized army, introduce better firearms and artillery, and to build European style forts in his state.

As a result of the Kew Letters, Dutch settlements on the Malabar Coast were surrendered to the British in 1795, in order to prevent them from being overrun by the French. Dutch Malabar remained British after the conclusion of the Anglo-Dutch Treaty of 1814, which exchanged the colony for Bangka Island.

Forts and trading posts

Religious policy
Unlike the Catholic Portuguese, the Protestant Dutch did not try to convert indigenous Hindu peoples to Christianity. However, they helped the Saint Thomas Christians of Malabar, who had been around there since the 1st century, against the pressure of the Roman Catholic Church. They relied heavily for trade and diplomatic missions on the Paradesi Jewish merchants of Cochin, who thrived during the Dutch era. They also tolerated the Malabari Jews and provided asylum.

Dutch Occupation of the Thiruchendur Temple

The Murugan temple at Thiruchendur was occupied by the Dutch East India company between the years 1646 to 1648, during the course of their war with the Portuguese. The local people tried during these 2 years to try and free their temple, with several futile attempts. The Dutch finally vacated the temple on orders from the Tirumala Nayaka. However, while vacating the temple, they hacked away and removed the idol of the main deity of the temple, and took it back to Galle, Dutch Ceylon. The idols was returned after many negotiations with the Madurai Nayakar.

Commanders of the Dutch Malabar
Dutch Malabar was one area of the Dutch East India Company (Vereenigde Oost-Indische Compagnie or VOC in Dutch) ruled by a commander. This is a list of commanders.

 apr-nov 1663 Pieter de Bitter / Cornelis Valkenburg
 1663–1665 Ludolph van Coulster
 1665–1667 IJsbrand Godske
 1667–1669 Lucas van der Dussen
 1669–1676 Hendrik van Rheede
 1676–1678 Jacob Lobs
 1678–1683 Marten Huysman
 1683–1687 Gelmer Vosburgh
 1688–1693 Isaac Dielen
 1693–1694 Alexander Wigman
 1694–1696 Adriaan van Ommen
 1697–1701 Magnus Wichelman
 1701–1704 Abraham Vink
 1704–1708 Willem Moerman
 1708–1709 Adam van der Duijn
 1709–1716 Barend Ketel
 1716–1723 Johannes Hertenberg
 1723–1731 Jacob de Jong
 1731 Wouter Hendriks
 1731–1734 Adriaan Maten
 1734–1742 Julius Valentyn Stein van Gollenesse
 1742–1747 Reinierus Siersma
 1747–1751 Corijn Stevens
 1751 Abraham Cornelis de la Haye
 1751–1756 Frederik Cunes
 1756–1761 Casparus de Jong
 1761–1764 Godefried Weyerman
 1764–1768 Cornelis Breekpot
 1768–1770 Christiaan Lodewijk Senff
 1770–1781 Adriaan Moens
 1781–1793 Johan van Angelbeek
 1793–1795 Jan Lambertus van Spall

See also
Malabar pepper
List of commanders of Dutch Malabar
Dutch Ceylon
Dutch Coromandel

Notes

References

  Iyer, K. V. Krishna "Zamorins of Calicut: From the earliest times to A D 1806". Kozhikode: Norman Printing Bureau, 1938
 Baldaeus, Philip "A Description of East India Coasts of Malabar and Coromandel and also of the Isle of Ceylon" 360 pp. maps, Reprint of the 1703 edition, Asian Educational Services, 1996, New Delhi-Madras, India. Translated from High Dutch in 1672.
 Koshy, M.O. "The Dutch power in Kerala 1729-1758" 334 pp. 2 maps Mittal Publ. 1989, New Delhi, India.
 Menachery, George (Ed.) The St. Thomas Christian Encyclopaedia of India, Vols. I(1982), II(1973), III(2009), Trichur & Ollur.
 Meyer, Raphael "The Jews of Cochin" Internet article American Asian Kashrus Services, 1995
 Poonen, T.I. "Dutch hegemony in Malabar and its collapse 1663–1795" 238 pp. Department of Publications, University of Kerala, 1978, Trivandrum, India.
 Ramachandran, Vaidyanadhan "Communication History of the Dutch in India" 46 pp. Artline Printers, 1997, Madras, India.
Panikkar, K. M. (1953). Asia and Western dominance, 1498-1945, by K.M. Panikkar. London: G. Allen and Unwin.
Panikkar, K. M. 1929: Malabar and the Portuguese: being a history of the relations of the Portuguese with Malabar from 1500 to 1663
Panikkar, K. M.  Malabar and the Dutch (1931)

Sources

1661 establishments in Dutch India
1795 disestablishments in Dutch India
European colonisation in Asia
History of Kerala
Former trading posts of the Dutch East India Company
Former settlements and colonies of the Dutch East India Company
Malabar Coast